Candy Bar was a lesbian bar that was based in Carlisle Street in Soho, London. It was started in 1996 by Kim Lucas who decorated the interior pink and provided lap and pole dancing. Men were allowed into the bar if accompanied by a woman.

In 2011, the bar was sold by Lucas to Gary Henshaw, owner of the Ku chain of London gay bars. New management brought in by Henshaw toned down the bright pink decoration. The bar was featured in a Channel 5 six-part fly-on-the-wall documentary series named Candy Bar Girls.

The bar closed in January 2014 following an increase in rents.

References 

1996 establishments in England
2014 disestablishments in England
LGBT pubs in London
Grade II listed pubs in the City of Westminster
Lesbian culture in the United Kingdom
Former pubs in London
Pubs in Soho
Women in London